Sterol-4-alpha-carboxylate 3-dehydrogenase, decarboxylating is an enzyme that in humans is encoded by the NSDHL gene. This enzyme is localized in the endoplasmic reticulum and is involved in cholesterol biosynthesis.

Clinical significance 

Mutations in the NSDHL gene are associated with CHILD  syndrome which is a X-linked dominant disorder of lipid metabolism with disturbed cholesterol biosynthesis, and typically lethal in males.

References

Further reading

External links
  GeneReviews/NCBI/NIH/UW entry on NSDHL related disorders including CHILD syndrome CK syndrome